Pontiac is a provincial electoral district in the Outaouais region of Quebec, Canada that elects members to the National Assembly of Quebec. It notably includes parts of the city of Gatineau as well as the municipalities of Pontiac, Mansfield-et-Pontefract, Shawville and Clarendon.

It was created for the 1867 election (and an electoral district of that name existed earlier in the Legislative Assembly of the Province of Canada).  Its final election was in 1970. It disappeared in the 1973 election and its successor electoral district was Pontiac-Témiscamingue.

However, Pontiac–Témiscamingue disappeared in the 1981 election and its successor electoral district was the re-created Pontiac.

It was named after Chief Pontiac, who led Pontiac's Rebellion in 1763 in the Great Lakes region.

Members of the Legislative Assembly of the Province of Canada 

This riding has elected the following members to the Legislative Assembly of the Province of Canada:

John Egan, (1854–1857)
George Bryson, Conservative (1857–1858) by-election
Edmund Heath, Conservative (1858–1861)
John Poupore, Conservative (1861–1867)

Members of the Legislative Assembly/National Assembly of Quebec 

This riding has elected the following members to the Legislative Assembly of Quebec (1867–1968) and the National Assembly of Quebec (1968–present):

Election results

|-
 
|Liberal
|André Fortin
|align="right"|25,659	
|align="right"|75.76
|align="right"|+19.13

|-

|-

|}

|-
 
|Liberal
|Charlotte L'Écuyer
|align="right"|16,981	
|align="right"|56.63
|align="right"|-9.47

|-

|-

|-

|}
* Increase is from Action Democratique du Quebec (ADQ)

|-
 
|Liberal
|Charlotte L'Écuyer
|align="right"|12,960
|align="right"|66.10
|align="right"|+7.56

|-

|-

|-

|}

|-
 
|Liberal
|Charlotte L'Écuyer
|align="right"|14,817
|align="right"|58.54
|align="right"|-17.98

|-

|-

|-

|}
* Increase is from UFP

|-
 
|Liberal
|Charlotte L'Écuyer
|align="right"|17,885
|align="right"|76.52
|align="right"|+1.25

|-

|-

|}

|-
 
|Liberal
|Robert Middlemiss
|align="right"|22,076
|align="right"|75.27
|align="right"|-4.91

|-

|Independent
|Maxime Gauld
|align="right"|112
|align="right"|0.38
|align="right"|-
|-

|Socialist Democracy
|Mohamed-Ali Khreis
|align="right"|108
|align="right"|0.37
|align="right"|-
|-

|Natural Law
|Claude Côté
|align="right"|100
|align="right"|0.34
|align="right"|-0.12
|-

|}

|-
 
|Liberal
|Robert Middlemiss
|align="right"|23,066
|align="right"|80.18
|align="right"|+33.62

|-

|-

|Natural Law
|Michael E. Wilson
|align="right"|131
|align="right"|0.46
|align="right"|-
|-

|}

|-
 
|Liberal
|Robert Middlemiss
|align="right"|9,514
|align="right"|46.56
|align="right"|-25.52

|-

|New Democrat
|Michael Coghlan
|align="right"|956
|align="right"|4.68
|align="right"|+0.03
|-

|}

|-
 
|Liberal
|Robert Middlemiss
|align="right"|13,888
|align="right"|72.08
|align="right"|+4.25

|-

|New Democrat
|Michel Martin
|align="right"|896
|align="right"|4.65
|align="right"|-
|-

|Progressive Conservative
|Anne Lupien
|align="right"|783
|align="right"|4.06
|align="right"|-
|-

|Christian Socialist
|Anne Charron
|align="right"|77
|align="right"|0.40
|align="right"|-
|}

|-
 
|Liberal
|Robert Middlemiss
|align="right"|15,157
|align="right"|67.83
|align="right"|+24.26

|-

|Freedom of Choice
|Stephen Hodgins
|align="right"|1,793
|align="right"|8.02
|align="right"|-
|-

|}

References

External links
Information
 Elections Quebec

Election results
 Election results (National Assembly)

Maps
 2011 map (PDF)
 2001 map (Flash)
2001–2011 changes (Flash)
1992–2001 changes (Flash)
 Electoral map of Outaouais region
 Quebec electoral map, 2011 

Politics of Gatineau
Pontiac